Shadows of the Underworld (German: Schatten der Unterwelt) is a 1931 German action film directed by and starring Harry Piel. It also features Dary Holm, Elisabeth Pinajeff and Hans Junkermann. It was made at the Terra Studios in Berlin while location shooting took place in St. Moritz in Switzerland.

The film's sets were designed by the art director Robert A. Dietrich and Emil Hasler.  A separate French-language version was also released.

Synopsis
After his invention is stolen and his business partner kidnapped, Harry West pursues the perpetrators while trying to avoid the police on his own trail.

Cast
 Harry Piel as Harry West  
 Dary Holm as Irene von Sheridan  
 Elisabeth Pinajeff as Yvette Finetti  
 Hans Junkermann as Amadeus Keller  
 Hans Behal as S Berry  
 Carl Balhaus as Jonny  
 Aruth Wartan as Apolloni  
 Leopold von Ledebur as Kommissär Braun  
 Carl Goetz as Jonnys Vater  
 Eugen Rex as Kommissar Stückli  
 Charly Berger 
 Olga Engl 
 Maria Forescu 
 Wolfgang von Schwindt

References

Bibliography 
 Hans-Michael Bock and Tim Bergfelder. The Concise Cinegraph: An Encyclopedia of German Cinema. Berghahn Books.

External links 
 

1931 films
1930s action films
German action comedy films
Films of the Weimar Republic
1930s German-language films
Films directed by Harry Piel
Terra Film films
Films set in Switzerland
German multilingual films
German black comedy films
1931 multilingual films
1930s German films
Films shot in Switzerland
Films shot at Terra Studios